Vieux-Mesnil is a commune in the Nord department in northern France. It is located 7km away from the town of Bavay and 11km away from the Forest of Mormal.

Heraldry

See also
Communes of the Nord department

References

Vieuxmesnil